House of Lords is the debut album by House of Lords, a Giuffria spin-off band, featuring keyboardist Gregg Giuffria. It was released in 1988 on Kiss bassist Gene Simmons' own label and distributed by RCA Records. The album reached position No. 78 in The Billboard 200 Chart on February 25, 1989.  
    
Rick Nielsen of Cheap Trick (with whom the band would later tour) co-wrote the song "Slip of the Tongue". Jeff Scott Soto of Talisman can be found on backing vocals throughout the whole album. Many other popular hard rock musicians contributed to the songwriting on the album, including Stan Bush, David Glen Eisley of Giuffria, Mandy Meyer of Asia and Johnny Warman.

Track listing

Personnel

Band members
James Christian - lead vocals   
Gregg Giuffria - keyboards, producer  
Lanny Cordola - guitars   
Chuck Wright - bass
Ken Mary - drums, percussion

Additional musicians
Jeff Scott Soto - backing vocals

Production
Andy Johns - producer
Bill Freesh - engineer
Howie Weinberg - mastering
Gene Simmons - executive producer

References

External links
Kiss-Related-Recordings   
Sleaze Roxx   
   

1988 debut albums
House of Lords (band) albums
Albums produced by Andy Johns
Albums produced by Gene Simmons